Imagination Station (formerly the Center of Science and Industry (COSI)) is a non-profit, hands-on science museum located on the Maumee riverfront in downtown Toledo, Ohio. The facility has over 300 exhibits for "children of all ages."

The museum opened in 1997 as COSI. After tax levies failed in 2006 and 2007, COSI closed its doors to the public on the last day of 2007 due to lack of funding. In 2008, voters approved an operating levy to reopen the facility as The Toledo Science Center. This interim name was replaced by "Imagination Station," which opened on 10 October 2009.

History
In 1984, the Portside Festival Marketplace shopping mall opened along the Maumee River, on the site of the former Tiedtke's department store. There were hopes that the mall might revitalize downtown Toledo, but it closed in 1990. A mayoral committee appointed to find the best use for the site heard repeated community requests for an educational family attraction. The city asked COSI Columbus about its experience and resources, and subsequently the city and the Columbus organization created COSI Toledo, an independent, not-for-profit organization with a board of trustees from northwest Ohio.

A fundraising campaign raised $9.5 million, surpassing the goal by $4.5 million. The state government gave another $10 million. The former Portside Festival Marketplace facility was transferred to COSI at a value of $16 million. On March 1, 1997, COSI opened its doors to the public. The facility attracted an average of 250,000 visitors per year over its first decade.

In 2005, COSI won a National Award for Museum and Library Service from the Institute of Museum and Library Services, the nation’s highest honor for extraordinary public service by a museum or library. The award was presented by Laura Bush at a White House ceremony in January 2006.

On July 28, 2006, COSI Toledo and COSI Columbus legally split so each could focus on their own financial troubles. Later that year, Berrien Springs Public Schools awarded a 2006 Teachers' Choice Awards to COSI for its distance learning program. After voters voted down a second levy in November 2007, COSI Toledo closed due to lack of funding on December 31, 2007.

On November 4, 2008, Lucas County, Ohio, voters approved an operating levy for the science center, enabling it to reopen in fall 2009.

Renovation
In 2019, the Imagination Station launched a $10 million upgrade, including an 8,200-square-foot theater with a 4K, 3D-capable screen and seats for people. KeyBank paid $2 million to name it KeyBank Discovery Theater. The new attraction requires the demolition of a pedestrian bridge. The center remains open during the construction, which is set to be complete in June 2020.

References

External links
 Imagination Station Toledo

2007 disestablishments in Ohio
Science museums in Ohio
Museums in Toledo, Ohio
Museums established in 1997